Andreadis (Greek: Ανδρεάδης) is a Greek surname. The female version -in Greek- of the name is Andreadi or Andreadou. But, following the Latin or English language, it is recommended as for the female version of the name, to use the same root which is also "Andreadis".

Andreadis is a patronymic surname which literally means "the son of Andreas", equivalent to English Anderson.

Notable examples include:

Men 
Adam Andreadis, Australian building designer
George Andreadis (1936-2015), Greek novelist
Teddy Andreadis, American musician
Themis Andreadis, Greek singer
Tim Andreadis, American Scientist

Women 
Ianna Andreadis (born 1960), Greek artist and photographer

Greek-language surnames
Surnames
Patronymic surnames
Surnames from given names